Bawang goreng is an Indonesian crispy fried shallots condiment, a popular garnish to be sprinkled upon various dishes of Indonesian cuisine. It is quite similar to crisp fried onion.

Ingredients
Compared to onion, shallots are much smaller in size and more intense in color — purplish red, locally known as bawang merah (lit. "red onion") in Indonesia. Shallots are thinly sliced and deep fried in plenty of cooking oil until golden crisp, and often placed in a tight glass jar for next use.

Uses
Bawang goreng has slightly bitter yet savoury flavour. Crispy fried shallots are often sprinkled upon steamed rice, fragrant coconut rice, fried rice, satay, soto, gado-gado, bubur ayam and many other dish as a condiment as well as garnishing. They are used for stir-fries vegetables, soups, stews, curries, noodles, rice and salads as toppings. Prepacked bawang goreng fried shallots are available in supermarkets and grocery store in Indonesia, and also Asian grocery store abroad.

See also

 Emping
 Krupuk
 Sambal
 Kecap manis
 Acar
 Indonesian cuisine

References

Indonesian condiments
Indonesian words and phrases